Webb's tufted-tailed rat (Eliurus webbi) is a species of rodent in the family Nesomyidae. It is found only in Madagascar. Its natural habitat is subtropical or tropical dry forests. It is threatened by habitat loss.

References

Musser, G. G. and M. D. Carleton. 2005. Superfamily Muroidea. pp. 894–1531 in Mammal Species of the World a Taxonomic and Geographic Reference. D. E. Wilson and D. M. Reeder eds. Johns Hopkins University Press, Baltimore.

Eliurus
Mammals of Madagascar
Mammals described in 1949
Taxonomy articles created by Polbot